The Vermeer Quartet was a string quartet founded in 1969 at the Marlboro Music Festival in Vermont and active until 2007.

With performances in practically every major city in North and South America, Europe, the Far East, and Australia, the Vermeer Quartet achieved an international stature as one of the world's finest ensembles. The Vermeer performed at virtually all the most prestigious festivals, including Tanglewood, Aldeburgh, Aspen, Mostly Mozart, Taos, Bath, South Bank, Lucerne, Stresa, Flanders, Kneisel Hall, Caramoor, Santa Fe, Albuquerque, Berlin, Schleswig-Holstein, Orlando, Florida, Daniel, Edinburgh, Great Woods, Spoleto, Ravinia, and the Casals Festival.  Based in Chicago, they spent part of each summer on the coast of Maine as the featured ensemble for Bay Chamber Concerts.  

The Vermeer Quartet performed well over two hundred works, including nearly all the "standard" string quartets, many lesser-known compositions, a number of contemporary scores, and various other works with guests.  Their discography includes the complete string quartets of Beethoven, Tchaikovsky, and Bartók, plus various other works by Haydn, Schubert, Mendelssohn, Brahms, Dvořák, Verdi, Tchaikovsky, Shostakovich, and Schnittke.  

In 2003 they received their second Grammy nomination for their CD of the Shostakovich and Schnittke piano quintets with Boris Berman on the Naxos label. Their recording of the six Bartók quartets was released by Naxos in May 2005, and received a 3rd Grammy nomination.

The Vermeer was associated with Northern Illinois University as "resident artist faculty" since 1970, where they trained some of the most gifted young ensembles performing today, including the Shanghai String Quartet, Enso String Quartet, Avalon String Quartet, Pacifica String Quartet, and Arianna String Quartet. They were also Fellows at the Royal Northern College of Music in Manchester, England.

The Seven Last Words of Christ

The Vermeer Quartet's Grammy-nominated CD of Haydn's The Seven Last Words of Christ [Alden Productions: CD 23042] -produced by its violist, Richard Young- features introductions by Rev. Martin Luther King Jr., evangelist Billy Graham, Father Virgil Elizondo, Dr. Martin Marty, Elder Dallin Oaks, Rev. Kelly Clem, Pastor T. L. Barrett, Father Raymond Brown, and Jason Robards.  Rev. Theodore Hesburgh (President Emeritus of the University of Notre Dame) wrote, "It is difficult to imagine a more appropriate group of theologians and preachers for the Vermeer's Seven Last Words of Christ recording.  The makeup of this group suggests not only a certain moral authority, but a spirit of inclusiveness. At the same time, in a most personal and effective manner, it reflects our religious and social diversity."  The American Record Guide calls this CD "an experience unlike any other."

The Vermeer played The Seven Last Words of Christ all over the world.  Following their very first live radio broadcast of this work in 1988 over WFMT (Chicago), well over a hundred different speakers collaborated with the Vermeer, including some of the most renowned religious figures of our time.  Their performances reached an estimated 75 million listeners worldwide, thus demonstrating an enduring appeal that extends far beyond the traditional classical music audience.  A book entitled Echoes from Calvary: Meditations on Franz Joseph Haydn's The Seven Last Words of Christ (Rowman & Littlefield, 2005) -written by its violist, Richard Young-  chronicles their long-time involvement with this Good Friday masterpiece and offers rare insight from many perspectives.

On April 3, 2012, the Vermeer Quartet in a reunion performance once again performed The Seven Last Words of Christ in a live broadcast on WFMT. Commentators were drawn from those who had collaborated in the performances in earlier years.

Reviews

Switzerland's Suisse wrote, "Out of this alchemy is born a thing of beauty which one can define, without hesitation, as perfection."  

About their Beethoven recordings, Stereo Review said, "What these peerless players give us is a heady blend of old-fashioned warmth and communicativeness, with exemplary demonstrations of modern standards of both taste and technique.  More persuasive performances of any of these quartets are simply not to be found."

Australia's The Age wrote, "Their performance was magnificent: majestic in style, technically without flaw, and utterly persuasive."  

According to Germany's Süddeutsche Zeitung, "This is music-making which reveals much of the inner self: music-making of untamed necessity that goes far beyond that which is merely pleasing to the ear."  

The Chicago Tribune wrote: "When presented as poignantly as the Vermeer presents it, the inner core of the piece is left so exposed that both religious and dramatic power radiate from within.  The tender loving care that the Vermeer lavishes over every phrase of this unique score is something quite special to behold."  

Poland's Ruch Muzyczny summed up, "The Vermeer's interpretation seems so nearly ideal that one can more easily appreciate music as universal harmony."

Members

The Vermeer Quartet's last members were:

Shmuel Ashkenasi, violin
Mathias Tacke, violin
Richard Young, viola
Marc Johnson, cello

Previous members included Pierre Menard, second violin, (1970–1992), followed by Mathias Tacke, (1992–2007). Scott Nikrenz, viola, 1969, followed by Nobuko Imai (until 1978), Jerry Horner (1978–1980), Bernard Zaslav (1980–1985), and Richard Young (1985–2007). Richard Sher, cello (1969–1972), Ron Leonard, 1972, succeeded by Marc Johnson (1973–2007).

Further reading

Interview with Shmuel Ashkenasi and Richard Young, June 21, 1989

Musical groups established in 1969
American string quartets
Cedille Records artists